Lough Bofin is a lake on the River Shannon on the County Roscommon–County Leitrim border in Ireland.

History and legend
The lake's name is Irish for "Lake of the white cow." Lough Bofin is separated from Lough Boderg ("Lake of the red cow") by the Derrycarne Narrows.

Recreation

Lough Bofin is a noted fishery for bream, rudd, roach, northern pike, eel and perch.

See also 
 List of loughs in Ireland

References 

Lakes of County Leitrim
Lakes of County Roscommon
River Shannon